Mareeg (also known as Mareg, Meregh and Märēg) is a locality in the Galguduud region of central Somalia, in the Galmudug state.

History
The town was founded in the 13th century, during the period marked by the local ascendancy of the Ajuran Empire. It later came under the Hiraab Imamate after the fall of the Ajuran Empire in the late 17th century. The region was named and legitimized by Sheikh Daud Ulusow at the turn of the 20th century and it became his official dominion stretching from El Hur to Ras Aswad. After independence in 1960, the city was made the center of the official Mareeg District.

According to the catalogo of the Museo della Garesa, coins from an early historical epoch were also recovered in the town.

Notable residents
Osman Haji Mohamed, Member of Parliament with the Somali Youth League.
Daud Abdulle Hirsi , first chief of the army  Somali armed forces

Notes

External links
Caribinieri forts in Mareeg
History of Mareeg

Populated places in Galguduud
Ajuran Sultanate

Ceeldheer.net